This is the discography of Tyler, the Creator, an American rapper, singer-songwriter, record producer and the former leader of the Los Angeles hip hop collective Odd Future.

Tyler's first studio album Goblin was released in 2011 and his single "Yonkers" became popular on YouTube and helped him to increase in popularity. Goblin debuted at number 5 on the Billboard 200 and received positive reviews praising its horrorcore style. In 2012 he collaborated with Odd Future on songs like "Oldie" or "Rella". In 2013 Tyler released his second studio album Wolf, which sold 100,000 in its first week and debuted at number 3 on the charts. It was promoted by the single "Domo23" and received positive reviews from music critics complimenting its diverse production. In April 2015 he released his third studio album Cherry Bomb, which debuted at number 4 on the charts and at number one on both the Top R&B/Hip-Hop Albums and Top Rap Albums charts. The album included features from Kanye West, Lil Wayne and others. On July 21, 2017, Tyler released his fourth studio album, Flower Boy, which includes features from Frank Ocean, A$AP Rocky, Lil Wayne and more. His fifth studio album, Igor, was released on May 17, 2019, which has features from Kanye West, Lil Uzi Vert, Playboi Carti, and others. His sixth studio album, Call Me If You Get Lost, was released on June 25, 2021. Both albums won Grammy Awards for Best Rap Album in 2020 and 2022 respectively.

Albums

Studio albums

Mixtapes

Video albums

Instrumental albums

Live albums

EPs

Singles

As lead artist

As featured artist

Other charted and certified songs

Guest appearances

Music videos

As lead artist

As featured artist

See also
Odd Future discography

Notes

References

External links
 Official website
 Official youtube account
 Tyler, The Creator discography at AllMusic
 
 

Discographies of American artists
Hip hop discographies
Discography